Anaamika is a 2014 Indian mystery thriller film directed by Sekhar Kammula, starring Nayanthara in the titular role, alongside Vaibhav Reddy, Pasupathy, and Harshvardhan Rane. A remake of the Hindi film Kahaani, the film was simultaneously shot in Telugu and Tamil, the latter titled Nee Enge En Anbe.

Plot
There was a bomb blast in People's Plaza at Hyderabad. Six months later, Anaamika (Nayanthara), an IT professional, comes to Hyderabad in search of her missing husband, Ajay (Harshvardhan Rane). As soon as she arrives in Hyderabad, she goes to the police station and waits to give a complaint. The police officers do not pay attention to her, and she almost faints. One policeman in the station named Sarathy (Vaibhav Reddy), decides to help her realizing that she was coming here for a huge reason; and the search for her missing husband begins. She goes to the hotel where her husband last stayed. The hotel manager is insistent that her husband had never stayed there. She proves that he did by discussing the state of a particular room in detail, based only on the description Ajay had given her. While staying there, she makes the acquaintance of a little boy named Raju who familiarises her with the local area.

She goes to places with Sarathy in search of her husband. She visits the local branch of the company for whom her husband worked. From the HR manager, she finds out that her husband had resigned two weeks prior to her coming to Hyderabad. Sarathy arrives at the branch and Anaamika informs him of her discovery.

On the morning of the next day, Raju is helping Anaamika in the hotel. He recognises a photo of Ajay and tells her that Ajay did indeed stay at the hotel. Anaamika learns from Raju that ten days prior, he saw Ajay being kidnapped by four goons. She informs the police of this and upon returning to the hotel, the manager presents her with Ajay's clothes. The manager said that he misled her in order to protect the reputation of his hotel. Raju and Sarathy then head to the police station so that Raju can try to identify the goons from a line-up - though this is unsuccessful. Later, Sarathy and Anaamika visit a mortuary where Anaamika confirms that an unidentified body held there is not Ajay. In the evening, Anaamika and Sarathy visit a Durga pooja where a set of bangles and a dress are blessed. Sarathy promises to take Anaamika to an informant the next morning.

After some difficulty, they find the informant who informs them that some students of the local Imam were discussing a kidnapping a few days ago. Sarathy and Anaamika then head to find the Imam. The Imam refuses Sarathy the opportunity to speak to his students, citing the effect such questioning will have on them. The Imam laments the negative opinion that many in the area seem to have towards madrassas. Despite Anaamika's pleas, the Imam says that he can only pray for her. They both return to Anaamika's hotel where Anaamika is consumed with grief. At the same time, the Imam feels that he can't ignore her pleas and telephones Sarathy. Sarathy learns that a wedding is to take place the next day with most of the Imam's students due in attendance. The Imam ends the call and retrieves a photo album, where he compares one of his pictures to Ajay's photo on his wedding day. Later, the Imam receives a visitor (Mayanand Thakuar) who shoots and kills the Imam.

Anaamika and Sarathy attend the wedding, taking Raju too in order that he might identify the goons. There they meet Sarathy's boss, Ravi Chandra (Vinay Varma). Sarathy soon gets a call that the Imam was killed and leaves the wedding. Ravi Chandra shows Anaamika the extent of his knowledge, telling her that the Imam was killed and that he knows of Ajay's kidnapping. Ravi Chandra promises to help Anaamika in return for her partaking in an affair with him. He forcefully grabs her, but she shakes herself free and flees. Ravi Chandra continues to harass Anaamika at her hotel, but she keeps herself safe.

The next day, Anaamika arrives at the police office to find that Sarathy has been placed on leave. Anaamika meets Ravi Chandra and agrees to an affair at his guesthouse provided he finds Ajay within 24 hours. Ravi Chandra begins investigating Ajay's disappearance, making many phone calls. However, he is later murdered by the same man who killed the Imam.

Upon learning of Ravi Chandra's death, a senior officer, Khan (Pasupathy), informs his boss - the Home Minister (Naresh) - that he wishes to investigate. Khan claims that Ajay resembles Milan Damji, a key suspect in the People's Plaza bombing. Khan arrives at Ravi Chandra's police station to speak with Anaamika, but begins a hostile interrogation of her. Anaamika is steadfast in her beliefs and causes Khan to calm down. Khan agrees to begin his investigation into Ajay's disappearance.

After visiting People's plaza with Sarathy to pay their respects, Anaamika heads to the hotel. Anaamika is revealed as the third target of the assassin, who arrives at her room. He attempts to kill her but is attacked by bees and flees. Sarathy comes to comfort Anaamika, but she is now determined to enter Ravi Chandra's home and find out what he knew. The two of them reach the home but hide as the assassin also enters the house. The assassin becomes aware of their presence and a scuffle ensues, with Sarathy and Anaamika giving chase through Hyderabad. Eventually, Anaamika runs into the assassin who drops his gun. Anaamika picks it up and kills him, just before Sarathy arrives. Sarathy takes the gun and tells Anaamika to leave. Unbeknownst to Sarathy, Anaamika has a hard drive that the assassin had taken from Ravi Chandra's home.

Khan meets Sarathy at the scene of the assassin's death. Khan has been instructed by the Home Minister to find the hard drive as a priority. Sarathy lies to Khan and says they never entered Ravi Chandra's home. Khan and Sarathy then pay Anaamika a visit, but Anaamika manages to keep the hard drive hidden. Overnight she combs through the drive, calling many included phone numbers. One such number is that of the Home Minister who is very troubled by this.

The next morning, Anaamika's room is raided by cops who beat her and ask for the hard drive. She maintains she doesn't know of such a drive and the cops leave with her laptop. Anaamika receives a video of Ajay on her phone, promising his safe return in exchange for the hard disk. Anaamika is to meet the kidnappers at midnight on the Clock Tower bridge. As Anaamika prepares for this meeting, Sarathy continues investigating. He finds the family of a kidnapper with Raju's help. The kidnapper's sister suspects a Datasoft employee coerced her brother into the crime and Sarathy brings her to Datasoft. There she identifies an employee, Laxman, and Sarathy heads to his home. There, Sarathy finds the same photo the Imam had in the album.

Finally, midnight arrives and Anaamika meets the kidnappers. Police have surrounded the bridge, though Anaamika is unaware of this. Laxman emerges from the kidnappers' car and takes the hard drive, giving Ajay back to Anaamika in return. The couple are reunited and leave in a taxi, while the police incinerate the kidnappers in their car. The Home Minister calls Khan and demands the hard disk, though Khan assumes it destroyed. Sarathy arrives at the bridge and tells Khan the truth of the matter. In fact, Milind Damji and Ajay are the same person. It is implied that in the Imam's photo, the two boys are Ajay/Milan and Laxman. Laxman worked with Ajay/Milan at Datasoft and was thus able to reconnect with him. Sarathy and Khan realise Anaamika is in grave danger and rush to save her.

Anaamika and Ajay/Milan are at People's Plaza, paying respect to the victims of his terror attack. Anaamika reveals that she knows about the terrible things he has done and Ajay/Milan approaches her to shoot her. However, Anaamika slashes his throat with her pen, killing him. She leaves the hard drive nearby for Khan and leaves. Khan and Sarathy arrive at the Plaza, finding the hard drive and resolving to give its contents to the media. They realise that Anaamika killed Ajay/Milan but destroy the evidence, with Khan declaring Anaamika as his hero.

Cast 

 Nayanthara as Anaamika
 Vaibhav Reddy as Parthasarathi 
 Pasupathy as Ajmad Ali Khan
 Harshvardhan Rane as Ajay Shasrti & Milan Damji
 Thagubothu Ramesh as Taxi Driver
 Vinay Varma as Ravi Chandra 
 Naresh as Aadhikesavayya, Home Minister
 Dheer Charan Srivastav as Hotel Manager
 Sriranjini as Parthasarathi's mother
 D. Narsingh Rao as Head constable
 Vinod Chelambathodi as Lakshman
 Mohsin Raja as Imaam
 Master KVJ Harsha as Raju
 CVL Narasimha Rao as Anaamika's Father
 Shruthi Mallpani as HR Manager
 Sudhakar Chilla as Commando Officer

Production

Jyothika was the initial choice of lead role, which was later replaced by actress Nayanthara. She with an all new look, kick-started her Sekhar Kammula bilingual in Telugu and Tamil on 28 April in Hyderabad. Nayanthara was given a bounded script with the look of her costume was given. She has an all new look in the film and the actress has given bulk dates for the film. Her character name is Anamika. The film is being co-produced by Endemol India, Logline Productions and Select Media Holdings.

The shoot on Sunday in the dusty streets of Old City, Hyderabad. Instead of Kolkata in the original, Sekhar chose Old City where the film will be set.

Sekhar was planning to complete the project under 50 days by shooting continuously in old Hyderabad.  Sekhar in an interview had said: "Since this untitled film is a bilingual, there's lot of work involved even before we start shooting. I want to shift all focus on the project which will be adapted and customised to the local sensibilities."

Soundtrack

Release

Critical reception
Nee Enge En Anbe was rated 3 by Rediff who said that "Kahaani was a huge hit so much was expected of the remake. Unfortunately, Nee Enge En Anbe is not in the same league". Deccan Chronicle said that "For those who have not seen Kahaani, this is a perfect 10 on 10 movie and for those who have, well all we can say is it is one of the better remakes". Sifi gave 4/5, stating " Nee Enge En Anbe on the face of it is a decent thriller, marked by an outstanding performance by Nayanthara, who is scintillating as she brings depth and poise to her character. Plus technically it is fab, with excellent background score by MM Keeravani which is in sync with the theme of the film along with camera work of Vijay C Kumar." Hindustan Times  said "Nee Enge En Anbe's plot and narrative style gripped me as much as Kahaani'''s did. The Tamil movie is mounted well, and although it is not a nail-biting thriller, it is still very engaging. I did not find a dull moment, thanks also to some smart" and gave 3 out of 5  Baradwaj Rangan of the Hindu wrote "Without atmosphere, a movie is just a collection of scenes that fit oddly, like misshapen jigsaw pieces. We may be able to get a sense of the whole puzzle, but only in our heads. We sense what could have been. What we see, though, is someone labouring to make the pieces fit. It isn't pretty".

The Times of India gave Anaamika'' three out of five stars and wrote that "Comparisons are inevitable when one remakes a critically acclaimed film like Vidya Balan starrer Kahani and in the case of Anaamika, Sekhar Kammula almost gets away because he deviates from the original plot to a large extent".

References

External links
 
 

2014 films
2010s Telugu-language films
2010s Tamil-language films
Indian multilingual films
Tamil remakes of Hindi films
Telugu remakes of Hindi films
Indian thriller drama films
Films scored by M. M. Keeravani
Viacom18 Studios films
2014 thriller drama films
2014 multilingual films
2014 drama films